Carposina coreana is a moth in the family Carposinidae. It was described by Chang Whan Kim in 1955. It is found in Korea and China.

References

Carposinidae
Moths described in 1955
Moths of Asia